Abel Dhaira (9 September 1987 – 27 March 2016) was an Ugandan international footballer who played as a goalkeeper. He capped 13 times for the Uganda national team.

Club career
Dhaira played club football in Uganda, the Congo and Iceland for Express, URA, AS Vita (whom he joined in December 2009 for US$22,000) and ÍBV. He was released by Tanzanian club Simba SC in December 2013.

International career
Dhaira made his international debut for Uganda in 2009. He won three CECAFA Cups in 2009, 2011 and 2012. At the 2012 CECAFA Cup he was hospitalised following a collision with an opposition player.

Death
In 2015, Dhaira was diagnosed with abdominal cancer and underwent a surgery in Uganda in December the same year. He returned to Iceland in January 2016 where he underwent further medical treatment. However, the cancer had spread throughout his body and on 27 March 2016, he died from the illness at The National University Hospital of Iceland, at the age of 28.

Honours
Uganda
 CECAFA Cup: 2009, 2011, 2012

References

1987 births
2016 deaths
People from Jinja District
Association football goalkeepers
Ugandan footballers
Uganda international footballers
Express FC players
Uganda Revenue Authority SC players
AS Vita Club players
Íþróttabandalag Vestmannaeyja players
Simba S.C. players
Ugandan expatriate sportspeople in Iceland
Ugandan expatriate footballers
Expatriate footballers in the Democratic Republic of the Congo
Expatriate footballers in Iceland
Expatriate footballers in Tanzania
Deaths from cancer in Iceland
Ugandan expatriate sportspeople in Tanzania
Ugandan expatriate sportspeople in the Democratic Republic of the Congo
Tanzanian Premier League players